Governor Hunt may refer to:

Alexander Cameron Hunt (1825–1894), Governor of the Territory of Colorado
Frank W. Hunt (1861–1906), 5th Governor of Idaho
George W. P. Hunt (1859–1934), Governor of Arizona
H. Guy Hunt (1933–2009), 49th Governor of Alabama
Jim Hunt (born 1937), 69th and 71st Governor of North Carolina
Lester C. Hunt (1892–1954), 19th Governor of Wyoming
Rex Hunt (governor) (1926–2012), Governor of the Falkland Islands from 1982 to 1985
Robert Hunt (governor) (fl. 1630s), Governor of the Providence Island colony in the western Caribbean sea from 1636 to 1638
Washington Hunt (1811–1867), 17th Governor of New York